Centerville High School may refer to:

 Centerville Senior High School, Centerville, Indiana
 Centerville High School (Iowa), Centerville, Iowa
 Centerville High School (Louisiana), a high school in Louisiana
 Centerville High School (Texas), a high school in Texas
 Centerville High School (Montana), a high school in Montana
 Centerville High School (Ohio), a public school of secondary education for grades 9–12 located in Centerville, Ohio,

See also
 Centreville High School (disambiguation)